Good Nature is an album by the Oxford-based post-rock band Youthmovies. It was released on 17 March 2008, on Drowned in Sound. It was the band's only album.

Critical reception
BBC Music wrote: "Strikingly original and refreshingly capricious in style, the Oxford five-piece have crafted something that, while far from immediate, demands attention and admiration." The Independent called the album "a refreshingly innovative and bloody-minded record that frequently surprises, especially when [the band] really cut loose."

Track listing
 "Magdalen Bridge"
 "The Naughtiest Girl is a Monitor"
 "Soandso and Soandso"
 "the Last Night of the Proms"
 "Cannulae"
 "If You'd Seen a Battlefield"
 "Shh! You'll Wake it!"
 "Something for the Ghosts"
 "Archive it Everywhere"
 "Surtsey"

Personnel
Andrew Mears – guitar, vocals
Al English –[guitar, backing vocals
Stephen Hammond – bass guitar
Graeme Murray – drums
Sam Scott – trumpet, keyboards

References

2008 albums
Youthmovies albums